Justin Evan Warfield (born April 20, 1973) is an American musician and hip hop MC. He is the lead vocalist, guitarist and keyboardist of the darkwave duo She Wants Revenge, which formed in 2004.

In 1993, he released a hip-hop album titled My Field Trip to Planet 9, which featured production from Prince Paul and QDIII. His latest album, the self-released Black Hesh Cult Mixtape, was released in July 2013.

Warfield was the featured vocalist on Bomb the Bass' song "Bug Powder Dust", which reached No. 24 on the UK Singles Chart in 1994.

Career
Justin Warfield is musically versatile, having been involved in several different genres over the years, and seems to choose his projects based on personal interest rather than career concerns. For example, his debut album was hip hop, but his next major musical project was a psychedelic rock band that released one album, The Justin Warfield Supernaut. In 1991, he had a hit single with the song "Season of the Vic," which reached No. 18 on the Billboard Hot Rap Singles chart.

He was a member of the group One Inch Punch, which released its only LP, Tao of the One Inch Punch, on Hut Records in 1996. Warfield is one half of the darkwave duo She Wants Revenge, a project different again from any of his previous incarnations. It is a heavily electronic group that is influenced by bands such as Joy Division, New Order, Bauhaus, and Depeche Mode to more contemporary groups such as Interpol, and the Faint, cultivating a stylized visual identity in a contemporary analogue to Depeche Mode and the Cure.

His most commercially recognizable track is probably "Bug Powder Dust," in which he was the vocalist on a Bomb the Bass release, and he was also featured on another track on its album, Clear. He also appeared as a guest vocalist on the Placebo song "Spite & Malice" from the album Black Market Music, the Cornershop song "Candyman" from the album When I Was Born for the 7th Time, the Crystal Method song "Kling to the Wreckage" on the album, Divided by Night, the Chemical Brothers' "Not Another Drugstore" from the single "Elektrobank", and the Freestylers's "Broadcast Channels" from the album, Pressure Point. Additionally, he has done remix work including a remix of "Joel" by the Boo Radleys from its 1995 single "It's Lulu", a remix of "Confide In Me" by Kylie Minogue in 1994 and "Butterfly" by Crazy Town.

Warfield was on several episodes of Saved By The Bell.

Personal life
Warfield is of African-American and Jewish Russian-Romanian maternal parentage.
He is married to Stefanie King and they have one son.

Discography

References

External links
Christian Hoard for Rolling Stone Online
Bradley Torreano at Yahoo! Music
[ Tao of the One-Inch Punch]
She Wants Revenge
Just In Hell: Justin Warfield's MySpace

American rock singers
American male rappers
African-American Jews
American people of Russian-Jewish descent
American people of Romanian-Jewish descent
Qwest Records artists
1973 births
Living people
Jewish rappers
Place of birth missing (living people)
African-American guitarists
American alternative rock musicians
Alternative rock guitarists
Alternative rock singers
American male guitarists
21st-century American rappers
21st-century American guitarists
21st-century African-American male singers
20th-century African-American male singers